Diego Dávila Coello y Pacheco, 1st Marquis of Navamorcuende, 17th Lord of Cardiel, El Bodón, Montalvo, El Hito and of Villar de Cañas (c. 1621 – c. 1680) was a Spanish soldier and colonial administrator who served as Royal Governor of Chile from March 19, 1667, to February 18, 1670.

Sources

Royal Governors of Chile
Marquesses of Spain
Lords of Spain
Knights of Santiago
Spanish generals
17th-century Spanish military personnel